Ro Tu-chol (born 2 October 1950) is  a Vice Premier of North Korea's cabinet and the Chairman of the State Planning Commission.  During Russian Deputy Prime Minister Yuri Trutnev's three-day visit to Pyongyang in May 2014, Ro negotiated on North Korea's behalf and signed a mutual cooperation agreement with Moscow.

References

1950 births
Living people
Government ministers of North Korea
Alternate members of the 6th Politburo of the Workers' Party of Korea
Members of the 6th Central Committee of the Workers' Party of Korea
People from South Hamgyong
People from Hamhung